State Route 102 (SR 102) is a  state highway that exists entirely within Rutherford County, Tennessee. Its southern terminus is in Almaville, an unincorporated community in the western part of the county, at SR 96. Its northern terminus is in Smyrna.

Route description
The southern half of SR 102 is called Almaville Road and has an interchange with I-840. The two-lane road travels north through rural, undeveloped land until reaching the rapidly growing residential and warehouse areas just outside Smyrna and expanding to four lanes. (The city has rapidly been annexing this land in recent years.) After an interchange with I-24, SR 102 becomes Lee Victory Parkway, named after a prominent local politician. There is a one-quadrant interchange with Old Nashville Highway. After an interchange with US 41/US 70S, SR 102 becomes Nissan Drive, named for the massive Nissan automobile manufacturing facility that faces the east side of the highway. The highway's northern terminus is at Jefferson Pike; northbound traffic on SR 102 continues westbound on Sam Ridley Parkway/SR 266 on its way back towards I-24. Thus, the combination of SR 102 and SR 266 forms a partial beltway around Smyrna.

Major intersections

References

102
Transportation in Rutherford County, Tennessee